Unorganized North Nipissing District is an unorganized area in northeastern Ontario, Canada. It includes the unincorporated areas in northern Nipissing District north of the Mattawa River.

Communities
Balsam Creek
Eldee
Jocko
Mulock
Osborne
Redbridge
Songis
Thorne
Tomiko
Tilden Lake

Geographic townships
La Salle Township
Mulock Township
Osborne Township
Stewart Township
Gladman Township

Demographics

Mother tongue (according to the Canada 2016 Census):
 English as first language: 80.4%
 French as first language: 15.4%
 English and French as first language: 0.3%
 Other as first language: 0.2%

Population trend:
 Population in 2016: 1784
 Population in 2011: 1853
 Population in 2006: 1798
 Population in 2001: 1856
 Population in 1996: 4149 (or 2016 when adjusted to 2001 boundaries)
 Population in 1991: 3911

See also
List of townships in Ontario

References

Geography of Nipissing District
Nipissing North